Tarbet (Scottish Gaelic: An Tairbeart) may refer the following places in Scotland:

 Tarbet, Argyll, a village on the side of Loch Lomond
 Tarbet, Loch Nevis, a hamlet in Lochaber, near Mallaig
 Tarbet, Sutherland, a hamlet on the north-west coast, near the island of Handa
 Castle Tarbet, on the island of Fidra in the Firth of Forth
 Tarbet Isle, in Loch Lomond

See also
 Tarbert (disambiguation)
 Tarbat, a civil parish in the east of Ross and Cromarty, Scotland
 Tarbert, a place name in Scotland and Ireland